Luis Alberto Estacio Valverde (born April 19, 1980) is a Colombian goalkeeper who plays for Deportes Quindío.

Career

International career
Was given his first Colombia national football team call up for the friendly against Mexico on September 30, 2009.

References

External links
 

1980 births
Living people
Colombian footballers
Association football goalkeepers
Categoría Primera A players
Categoría Primera B players
Independiente Medellín footballers
Deportivo Pereira footballers
Deportivo Cali footballers
Atlético Huila footballers
Atlético Junior footballers
Cúcuta Deportivo footballers
Águilas Doradas Rionegro players
Deportes Tolima footballers
Unión Magdalena footballers
Boyacá Chicó F.C. footballers
Deportivo Pasto footballers
Atlético F.C. footballers
Deportes Quindío footballers
Footballers from Cali
20th-century Colombian people
21st-century Colombian people